La Roue (French) or Het Rad (Dutch) is a Brussels Metro station on the western branch of line 5. It is located in the municipality of Anderlecht, in the western part of Brussels, Belgium. It serves the La Roue/Het Rad ("The Wheel") district, after which it is named.

The station opened on 15 September 2003 as part of the Bizet–Erasme/Erasmus extension of former line 1B including the stations Erasme/Erasmus, Eddy Merckx and CERIA/COOVI. Following the reorganisation of the Brussels Metro on 4 April 2009, it is served by line 5.

External links

Brussels metro stations
Railway stations opened in 2003
Anderlecht